Agwari may refer to:
Agwari, Jalore, village in Jalore district, Rajasthan, India
Agwari, Sikar, village in Sikar district, Rajasthan, India